Remembrance is the act of remembering, the ability to remember, or a memorial.  

Remembrance or Remembrances may also refer to:

Events
:Category:Remembrance days
Day of Remembrance for Truth and Justice, a commemorative day observed by Argentina
Remembrance Day, a commemorative day observed by many Commonwealth countries
Remembrance of the Dead, held annually on May 4 in the Netherlands
Remembrance Sunday (UK), is the second Sunday in November, the Sunday nearest to 11 November (Armistice Day)
Remembrance Day bombing, took place on 8 November 1987 in Enniskillen, County Fermanagh, Northern Ireland
Remembrance of Muharram, an important period of mourning in the Shi'a branch of Islam

Film and television

Remembrance (1922 film), American drama film directed and written by Rupert Hughes
Remembrance (1982 film), British film directed by Colin Gregg
Remembrance (1996 film), TV film based on the novel by Danielle Steel
Remembrance (2001 film), Canadian short film, a wartime romance among trainee spies
Remembrance (2011 film), German film, a wartime romance in a concentration camp
 "Remembrances", a 2014 episode of The Legend of Korra
 "Remembrance" (Star Trek: Picard), an episode of Star Trek: Picard

Music
Remembrance – A Memorial Benefit, a 2001 album by American pianist George Winston
Remembrance (Cecil Taylor & Louis Moholo album), 1988
Remembrance (Elvin Jones album), 1978
Remembrance (Joe McPhee album), recorded 2001 and released in 2005
Remembrance (Ketil Bjørnstad album), 2008
Remembrance (EP), a 2014 EP by Suicideyear
Remembrance (band), a Christian metalcore band
 Remembrances (David Murray album), 1991
 Remembrances (The Lucy Show album), 2011
 "Remembrance", a song by God Is an Astronaut from the 2002 album The End of the Beginning
 "Remembrance", a song by Gojira from the 2003 album The Link

Literature

Remembrance (Cabot novel), 2016 novel by Meg Cabot
Remembrance, 1977 play by Derek Walcott
Remembrance (1981 novel), by Danielle Steel
Remembrance, 2012 novel by Theresa Breslin

See also
Remembrancer, originally one of certain subordinate officers of the English Exchequer
Remember (disambiguation)
Memorial (disambiguation)